Terence Christopher Kelly (April 1931 – 19 June 2010), was an Irish and Canadian chess player, Irish Chess Championship winner (1954).

Biography
In the first half of the 1950s Terry Kelly was one of the strongest Irish chess players. He three times participated in Irish Chess Championships: 1953, 1954, 1955, and won this tournament in 1954. In 1955, Terry Kelly with chess club Eoghan Ruadh won Irish National Chess Club Championship.

Terry Kelly played for Ireland in the Chess Olympiad:
 In 1954, at second board in the 11th Chess Olympiad in Amsterdam (+0, =3, -14).

In the mid-1950s Terry Kelly moved to Canada, after which he did not participate in high-level chess tournaments.

References

External links

Terry Kelly chess games at 365chess.com

1930 births
2010 deaths
Irish chess players
Canadian chess players
Chess Olympiad competitors
20th-century chess players